Kelly Maree Golebiowski (born 26 July 1981) is a former Australian soccer player who played at national league level in Australia and the United States.

Playing career

Club career
Golebiowski played in the Australian Women's National Soccer League for NSW Sapphires.

Between 2001 and 2002 Golebiowski played for Hampton Roads Piranhas in the USL W-League.

In 2003 Golebiowski played 19 matches for the Washington Freedom in the final season of the Women's United Soccer Association (WUSA).

After her stint with the Freedom, she rejoined the Piranhas.

Golebiowski later returned to the Washington Freedom, who had joined the USL W-League.

She played for Sydney FC during the 2008–09 season of the Australian W-League.

Golebiowski joined the Central Coast Mariners for the 2009 season.

International career
In July 1996, Golebiowski made her debut for Australia as a 14-year-old.

She represented Australia at the 1999 FIFA Women's World Cup, 2000 Olympics, and 2003 FIFA Women's World Cup.

References

1981 births
Living people
Australian people of Polish descent
Australian Institute of Sport soccer players
Australian women's soccer players
Central Coast Mariners FC (A-League Women) players
1999 FIFA Women's World Cup players
2003 FIFA Women's World Cup players
Olympic soccer players of Australia
Footballers at the 2000 Summer Olympics
Australia women's international soccer players
Soccer players from Sydney
Women's association football midfielders
People educated at Westfields Sports High School
Hampton Roads Piranhas players
Australian expatriate women's soccer players
Australian expatriate sportspeople in the United States
Expatriate women's soccer players in the United States
Washington Freedom players
Women's United Soccer Association players